The Leake–Ingham Building is a historic commercial building in Camden, Arkansas.  It is located behind the McCollum-Chidester House at 926 Washington Street NW, and is part of the Ouachita County Historical Society Museum.  It is one of the oldest commercial buildings in Camden.  The single-story Greek Revival structure was built c. 1850 by William Leake, a prominent Camden attorney, and has a distinctive Greek temple front.  It was originally located on a prominent corner of the city, at Washington and Harrison Streets.  Leake operated a law practice from the building until 1866 with various partners, after which it was used to house government offices, and later Camden's first library.  Threatened with demolition in the 1950s, it was moved several times before its acquisition by the historical society.

The building was listed on the National Register of Historic Places in 1975.

See also
National Register of Historic Places listings in Ouachita County, Arkansas

References

External links
About the Ouachita County Historical Society

Office buildings on the National Register of Historic Places in Arkansas
Greek Revival architecture in Arkansas
Commercial buildings completed in 1850
Buildings and structures in Camden, Arkansas
Individually listed contributing properties to historic districts on the National Register in Arkansas
National Register of Historic Places in Ouachita County, Arkansas
1850 establishments in Arkansas
Relocated buildings and structures in Arkansas